Alabama-Huntsville was the only school to field a team during the 1986–87 NCAA Division II men's ice hockey season. They played an independent schedule, and moved up to Division I for 1987–88.

Regular season
Standings

Results
10/31: Alabama-Huntsville - Iowa State (6:3)
11/1: Alabama-Huntsville - Iowa State (10:6)
11/7: Alabama-Huntsville - St. Michael's (6:4)
11/8: Geneseo State - Alabama-Huntsville (6:3)
11/21: Alabama-Huntsville - Villanova (13:2)
11/22: Alabama-Huntsville - Villanova (15:1)
11/29: Colgate - Alabama-Huntsville (3:2)
11/30: Colgate - Alabama-Huntsville (12:2)
12/5: North Dakota State - Alabama-Huntsville (4:2)
12/6: Alabama-Huntsville - North Dakota State (4:2)
12/12: Alabama-Huntsville - Notre Dame (4:0)
12/13: Alabama-Huntsville - Notre Dame (6:3)
1/2: Merrimack - Alabama-Huntsville (6:1)
1/3: Alabama-Huntsville - Merrimack (6:4)
1/9: Alabama-Huntsville - Michigan-Dearborn (6:4)
1/10: Michigan-Dearborn - Alabama-Huntsville (9:8)
1/16: Alabama-Huntsville - Fairfield (9:1)
1/17: Alabama-Huntsville - Wesleyan (5:1)
1/23: Alabama-Huntsville - Iowa State (3:1)
1/24: Alabama-Huntsville - Iowa State (9:4)
1/30: Michigan-Dearborn - Alabama-Huntsville (6:3)
1/31: Alabama-Huntsville - Michigan-Dearborn (4:2)
2/5: Quebec Trois-Rivieres - Alabama-Huntsville (8:5)
2/6: Quebec Trois-Rivieres - Alabama-Huntsville (6:4)
2/13: Alabama-Huntsville - Air Force (5:2)
2/14: Air Force - Alabama-Huntsville (4:1)
2/20: Alabama-Huntsville - Ohio University (9:2)
2/21: Alabama-Huntsville - Ohio University (6:3)
2/27: Alabama-Huntsville - Upsala (11:6)
2/28: Alabama-Huntsville - Notre Dame (3:2 OT)

External links
Alabama-Huntsville Hockey History
Alabama-Huntsville All-Time Results

NCAA